Lake Ontario's Woodbine Beach is the largest of the four beaches in the Beaches in Toronto, Ontario, Canada. Located along Lake Shore Boulevard at the foot of Woodbine Avenue, it is next to Ashbridge's Bay and Kew-Balmy Beach. Woodbine beach is the westernmost beach in the Beaches, and the series of beaches extend east until the RC Harris Water Treatment Plant. The beach runs parallel to the boardwalk and the Martin Goodman Trail, and is part of Woodbine Beach Park.

History
The area around Woodbine Beach was once a cottage community in a similar style to the communities on the Toronto Island, today it is a popular beach. Until Lake Shore Boulevard was extended to Woodbine Avenue in the 1950s, Woodbine Beach was not a bathing beach, but rather a wooded area known as 'The Cut'. Woodbine Beach and neighbouring Ashbridge's Bay are a popular place to visit to see the fireworks for Victoria Day. There are over 90 volleyball courts, and various outdoor leisure activity rentals, such as bicycles, canoes, kayaks, and standup paddle boards. Next to the beach is the Donald D. Summerville Outdoor Olympic Pool, an outdoor elevated Olympic-sized swimming pool, overlooking the beach. Construction for the pool started in 1961, and it was designed to add temporary scaffolding for the spectator seats in the event Toronto was to ever host the Olympics.  The Martin Goodman Trail runs along the boardwalk.

Maintenance and water quality
Woodbine Beach and Kew-Balmy Beach are Blue Flag certified for cleanliness and are suitable for swimming, with this distinction being awarded to Woodbine since 2005. The beach is maintained by Toronto Parks, Forestry and Recreation. Since 1990, the quality of the water and sand has improved dramatically. The water quality at the beach is tested daily, and is clean to swim on most days, including after storms. In addition, the sand is machine groomed daily. Besides, the terrain is gentle to far offshore, and there is not much seaweed, which is ideal for swimming. However, water temperature can be highly unpredictable. While warm water around 20C can often be experienced from July to early September, occasionally water temperature can drop to the lower teens celsius for days, due to upward swirl of chilly deep-lake water known as upwelling, which is driven by strong westerly wind (thus unrelated to air temperature).

References

Beaches of Toronto